The 26th Vanier Cup was played on November 24, 1990, at the SkyDome in Toronto, Ontario, and decided the CIAU football champion for the 1990 season. The Saskatchewan Huskies won their first ever championship by defeating the Saint Mary's Huskies by a score of 24–21 in the first ever Vanier Cup game between two schools with the same team nickname.

References

External links
 Official website

Vanier Cup
Vanier Cup
1990 in Toronto
November 1990 sports events in Canada